Darevskia bithynica is a lizard species in the genus Darevskia. It is endemic to Turkey.

References

Darevskia
Reptiles of Turkey
Endemic fauna of Turkey
Reptiles described in 1909
Taxa named by Lajos Méhelÿ